Steatoda lepida is a species of Theridiidae that is endemic to New Zealand.

Taxonomy 
Steatoda lepida was first described in 1880 as Lithyphantes lepidus.  In 1886, it was independently described again as Theridium triloris by Arthur Urquhart. In 1935, Elizabeth Bryant recognized T. triloris as a synonym of L. lepidus. S. lepida was independently described again in 1956 as Lithyphantes regius.  In 1983, L. regius was recognized as belonging to the Steatoda genus and was subsequently named Steatoda regius. In 1994, S. regius was recognized as a synonym of L. lepidus and the two were merged to form S. lepida.

References 

Theridiidae
Spiders of New Zealand
Spiders described in 1880
Endemic fauna of New Zealand
Endemic spiders of New Zealand